The Blues Brothers are an American blues and soul revivalist band founded in 1978 by comedians Dan Aykroyd and John Belushi as part of a musical sketch on Saturday Night Live. Belushi and Aykroyd fronted the band, in character, respectively, as lead vocalist 'Joliet' Jake Blues and harmonica player/vocalist Elwood Blues, donning black suits with matching fedoras and sunglasses. The band was composed of well-known musicians, and debuted as the musical guest in a 1978 episode of Saturday Night Live, opening the show performing "Hey Bartender", and later "Soul Man".

In 1978, the band released their debut album, Briefcase Full of Blues, and opened for the Grateful Dead at the closing of Winterland Arena in San Francisco. They gained further fame after spawning a Hollywood comedy film in 1980, The Blues Brothers.

After Belushi's death in 1982, the Blues Brothers continued to perform with a rotation of guest singers and other band members. The band reformed in 1988 for a world tour and again in 1998 for a sequel film, Blues Brothers 2000.

Band history

Origins

The genesis of the Blues Brothers was a January 17, 1976, Saturday Night Live sketch. In it, "Howard Shore and his All-Bee Band" play the Slim Harpo song "I'm a King Bee", with Belushi singing and Aykroyd playing harmonica, dressed in the bee costumes they wore for "The Killer Bees" sketches. In 1978, guitarist Arlen Roth was performing on SNL with Art Garfunkel who was that week's host of the show. Before the actual live show, Belushi and Aykroyd asked Roth and others to join them onstage in the outfits that would later become the Blues Brothers' look. Roth taught Belushi the lyrics to "Rocket 88" so they could perform it that night. This was also discussed on Aykroyd's "Elwood's Bluesmobile" radio show, when Roth was interviewed about his Slide Guitar Summit album, and the song "Rocket 88".

Following tapings of SNL, it was popular among cast members and the weekly hosts to attend Aykroyd's Holland Tunnel Blues bar, which he had rented not long after joining the cast. Aykroyd and Belushi filled a jukebox with songs from Sam & Dave, punk band The Viletones and others. Belushi bought an amplifier and they kept some musical instruments there for anyone who wanted to jam. It was at the bar that Aykroyd and Ron Gwynne wrote and developed the story which Aykroyd turned into the draft screenplay for the Blues Brothers movie, better known as the "tome", because it contained so many pages.

It was also at the bar that Aykroyd introduced Belushi to the blues. An interest soon became a fascination, and it was not long before the two began singing with local blues bands. Jokingly, SNL band leader Howard Shore suggested they call themselves "The Blues Brothers". In an April 1988, interview he gave to the Chicago Sun-Times, Aykroyd said the Blues Brothers act borrowed from Sam and Dave and others; the Sun-Times quoted him as explaining: "Well, obviously, the duo thing and the dancing, but the hats came from John Lee Hooker. The suits came from the concept that when you were a jazz player in the '40s, '50s '60s, to look straight, you had to wear a suit."

The band was modeled in part on Aykroyd's experience with the Downchild Blues Band, one of the first professional blues bands in Canada, with whom Aykroyd played on occasion. Aykroyd encountered the band in the early 1970s, around the time of his attendance at Carleton University in Ottawa, Ontario, Canada, and where his interest in the blues developed through attending and occasionally performing at Ottawa's Le Hibou Coffee House. As Aykroyd described it:

The Toronto-based Downchild Blues Band, co-founded in 1969 by two brothers, Donnie and Richard "Hock" Walsh, served as an inspiration for the two Blues Brothers characters. Aykroyd modeled Elwood Blues in part on Donnie Walsh, a harmonica player and guitarist, while Belushi's Jake Blues character was modeled after Hock Walsh, Downchild's lead singer. In their first album, Briefcase Full of Blues (1978), Aykroyd and Belushi featured three well-known Downchild songs closely associated with Hock Walsh's vocal style: "I've Got Everything I Need (Almost)", written by Donnie Walsh, "Shotgun Blues", co-written by Donnie and Hock Walsh, and "Flip, Flop and Fly", co-written and originally popularized by Big Joe Turner. All three songs were on Downchild's second album, Straight Up (1973), with "Flip, Flop and Fly" becoming the band's most successful single, in 1974.

Belushi's budding interest in the blues solidified in October 1977 when he was in Eugene, Oregon, filming National Lampoon's Animal House. He went to a local hotel to hear 25-year-old blues singer/harmonica player Curtis Salgado. After the show, Belushi and Salgado talked about the blues for hours. Belushi found Salgado's enthusiasm infectious. In an interview at the time with the Eugene Register-Guard, he said:

In an interview with Crawdaddy he added:

Salgado lent him some albums by Floyd Dixon, Charles Brown, Johnny "Guitar" Watson, and others. Belushi was hooked.

Belushi began to join Salgado on stage, singing the Floyd Dixon song "Hey, Bartender" on a few occasions, and using Salgado's humorous alternate lyrics to "I Don't Know":

These lyrics were used in the band's debut performance on SNL.

Band formation
With the help of pianist-arranger Paul Shaffer, Belushi and Aykroyd started assembling a collection of studio talents to form their own band. These included SNL band members saxophonist "Blue" Lou Marini and trombonist-saxophonist Tom Malone, who had previously played in Blood, Sweat & Tears. At Shaffer's suggestion, guitarist Steve Cropper and bassist Donald "Duck" Dunn, the powerhouse combo from Booker T. & the M.G.'s and subsequently almost every hit out of Memphis' Stax Records during the 1960s, were signed as well.

Belushi wanted a powerful trumpet player and a hot blues guitarist, so Juilliard-trained trumpeter Alan Rubin was brought in, as was guitarist Matt "Guitar" Murphy, who had performed with many blues legends.

For the brothers' look, Belushi borrowed John Lee Hooker's trademark Ray-Ban Wayfarer sunglasses and soul patch.

Their style was fresh and in many ways, different from prevailing musical trends: A very raw and "live" sound compared to the increasing use of sound synthesis and vocal-dominated music of the late 1970s and 1980s.

Sound
In Stories Behind the Making of The Blues Brothers, a 1998 documentary included on some DVD editions of the first Blues Brothers film, Cropper noted that some of his peers thought that he and the other musicians backing the Blues Brothers were selling out to Hollywood or using a gimmick to make some quick money. Cropper responded by stating that he thought Belushi was as good as (or even better than) many of the singers he had backed; he also noted that Belushi had, early in his career, briefly been a professional drummer, and had an especially keen sense of rhythm.

Albums, early gigs, character backgrounds
The Blues Brothers recorded their first album, Briefcase Full of Blues, in 1978 while opening for comedian Steve Martin at Los Angeles' Universal Amphitheatre. The album reached #1 on the Billboard 200, went double platinum, and featured Top 40 hit recordings of Sam & Dave's "Soul Man" and The Chips' "Rubber Biscuit".

The album liner notes fleshed out the fictional backstory of Jake and Elwood, having them growing up in a Roman Catholic orphanage in Rock Island, Illinois and learning the blues from a janitor named Curtis. Their blood brotherhood was sealed by cutting their middle fingers with a string said to come from the guitar of Elmore James.

The band, along with the New Riders of the Purple Sage, opened for the Grateful Dead for the final show at Winterland, New Year's Eve 1978.

With the film, came the soundtrack album, which was the band's first studio album. "Gimme Some Lovin'" was a Top 40 hit and the band toured to promote the film, The tour began on June 27, 1980 at Poplar Creek Music Theater. The tour also led to a third album (and second live album), Made in America, recorded at the Universal Amphitheatre in 1980. The track "Who's Making Love" peaked at No 39. It was the last recording the band would make with Belushi's Jake Blues.

Belushi's wife, Judith Jacklin, and his friend, Tino Insana, wrote a book, Blues Brothers: Private, that further fleshed out the Blues Brothers' universe and gave a back story for the first movie.

In 1981, Best of the Blues Brothers was released, with a previously unreleased track, a version of The Soul Survivors' "Expressway to Your Heart", and alternate live recordings of "Everybody Needs Somebody to Love" and "Rubber Biscuit"; this album would be the first of several compilations and hits collections issued over the years. A 1998 British CD compilation, The Complete Blues Brothers, exclusively featured The Lamont Cranston Band's "Excuse Moi Mon Cheri", from the L.A. Briefcase recordings, originally available only as the b-side to the "Soul Man" 45 rpm single.

On March 5, 1982, Belushi died in Hollywood of an accidental overdose of heroin and cocaine.

After Belushi's death, updated versions of the Blues Brothers have performed on SNL and for charitable and political causes. Aykroyd has been accompanied by Jim Belushi and John Goodman in character as "Zee" Blues and "Mighty Mack" McTeer. The copyright owners have also authorized some copycat acts to perform under the Blues Brothers name; one such act performs regularly at the Universal Studios Florida theme park in Orlando, Florida and Universal Studios Hollywood.

In 1995, the Band collaborated with the Italian singer Zucchero Fornaciari, who had been invited to the event in memory of John Belushi's 46th birthday. After a concert together, they registered the videoclip of the famous Zucchero song "Per Colpa Di Chi?" at the House of Blues.
In 1997, an animated sitcom with Jake and Elwood was planned, but scrapped after only eight episodes were produced. Peter Aykroyd and Jim Belushi replaced their brothers as the voices of Elwood and Jake.

To promote Blues Brothers 2000 (1998), Dan Aykroyd, Jim Belushi and John Goodman performed at the Super Bowl XXXI halftime show, along with ZZ Top and James Brown. The performance was preceded with a faux news report stating the Blues Brothers had escaped custody and were on their way to the Louisiana Superdome.

Aykroyd has continued to be an active proponent of blues music and parlayed this avocation into foundation and partial ownership of the House of Blues franchise, a national chain of nightclubs. In Italy the franchise is now owned by Zucchero, who used the brand during the tour promoting his album Black Cat of 2016.

Jim Belushi toured with the band for a short time as "Zee Blues", and recorded the album Blues Brothers and Friends: Live from Chicago's House of Blues with Dan Aykroyd. Jim would later reunite with Aykroyd to record yet another album, not as the Blues Brothers but as themselves: Belushi/Aykroyd – Have Love Will Travel (Big Men-Big Music).

In 2004, the musical The Blues Brothers Revival premiered in Chicago. The story was about Elwood trying to rescue Jake from an eternity in limbo/purgatory. The musical was written and composed with approval and permission from both the John Belushi estate (including his widow, Judith Belushi-Pisano) and Dan Aykroyd.

The Blues Brothers featuring Elwood and Zee regularly perform at House of Blues venues and various casinos across North America. They are usually backed by Jim Belushi's Sacred Hearts Band. The Original Blues Brothers Band tours the world regularly. The only original members still in the band are Steve Cropper and Lou Marini. The lead singers are Bobby "Sweet Soul" Harden, Rob "The Honeydripper" Papparozi and Tommy "Pipes" McDonnel. They are occasionally joined by Eddie Floyd.

Aykroyd most recently hosted a radio show as his character Elwood Blues on the weekly House of Blues Radio Hour, heard nationwide on the Dial Global Radio Network until 2017. It has now been succeeded by The Sam T. Blues Revue which airs Wednesday nights on KHBT.

Films

The Blues Brothers

In 1980, The Blues Brothers, directed by John Landis, was released. It featured epic car chases involving the Bluesmobile and musical performances by Aretha Franklin, James Brown, Cab Calloway, Ray Charles and John Lee Hooker. The story is set in and around Chicago, Illinois. It is a tale of redemption for the paroled convict Jake Blues and his brother Elwood, who after a visit to Sister Mary Stigmata (Kathleen Freeman), otherwise known as "The Penguin" at the Catholic orphanage where they grew up, choose to take on a "mission from God" and reform their old blues band in order to raise funds to save the orphanage. Along the way, the brothers are targeted by a "mystery woman" (Carrie Fisher) and chased by the Illinois State Police, a country and western band called the Good Ol' Boys, and "Illinois Nazis". The film grossed $57 million domestically in its theatrical release, making it the 10th highest-grossing movie of 1980, and grossed an additional $58 million in foreign release.

Blues Brothers 2000

With Landis again directing, the sequel to The Blues Brothers was made in 1998. It fared considerably worse than its predecessor with fans and critics, though it is more ambitious in terms of musical performances by the band and has a more extensive roster of guest artists than the first film. The story picks up 18 years later with Elwood being released from prison, and learning that his brother has died. He is once again prevailed upon to save some orphans, and with a 10-year-old boy named Buster Blues (J. Evan Bonifant) in tow, Elwood again sets about the task of reuniting his band. He recruits some new singers, Mighty Mack (John Goodman) and Cab (Joe Morton), a policeman who was Curtis' son. All the original band members are found, as well as some performers from the first film, including Aretha Franklin and James Brown. There are dozens of other guest performers, including Eric Clapton, Steve Winwood, Junior Wells, Lonnie Brooks, Eddie Floyd, Wilson Pickett, Isaac Hayes, Sam Moore, Taj Mahal and Jonny Lang, Blues Traveler, as well as an all-star supergroup led by B.B. King called the Louisiana Gator Boys. On the run from the police, Russian mafia and a racist militia, the band eventually ends up in Louisiana, where they enter a Battle of the Bands overseen by a voodoo practitioner named Queen Moussette (Erykah Badu). During a song by the Blues Brothers (a Caribbean number called "Funky Nassau"), a character played by Paul Shaffer asks to cut in on keyboards, which Murph allows. This marks the first time in a film that the Blues Brothers play with their original keyboardist.

Discography

Soundtrack albums 
 1980 – The Blues Brothers (Atlantic)

Live albums
 1978 – Briefcase Full of Blues (Atlantic)
 1980 – Made in America (Atlantic)
 1997 – Blues Brothers and Friends: Live from Chicago's House of Blues (House of Blues)

Compilation albums
 1981 – Best of the Blues Brothers (Atlantic)
 1983 – Dancin' Wid Da Blues Brothers (Atlantic)
 1988 – Everybody Needs Blues Brothers (Atlantic)
 1992 – The Definitive Collection (Atlantic)
 1995 – The Very Best of The Blues Brothers (Atlantic/EastWest)
 1998 – The Blues Brothers Complete (Atlantic/EastWest)
 2003 – The Essentials (Atlantic)
 2005 – Gimme Some Lovin' & Other Hits (Flashback Records)
 2008 – American Music Legends (Rhino Custom Products/Cracker Barrel Old Country Store)
 2017 – An Introduction to Blues Brothers (Atlantic Records/Rhino Records)
 2017 – Drop the Needle on the Hits: The Best of the Blues Brothers (Rhino Records)

Singles

Other appearances 

 1998 – Blues Brothers 2000 (various tracks) (Universal Records)

The Elwood Blues Revue 
Live albums

 1988 – Atlantic Records 40th Anniversary (Atlantic) (as The Elwood Blues Revue)

Other appearances

1988 – The Great Outdoors soundtrack (Atlantic) (as The Elwood Blues Revue)
 1992 – Nothing but Trouble (Music from the Motion Picture Soundtrack) (Warner Bros / WEA) (as The Elwood Blues Revue)

The Blues Brothers Band 
Studio albums
 1992 – Red, White & Blues (WEA)
 2017 – The Last Shade of Blue Before Black (The Original Blues Brothers Band, Severn Records)
Live albums

 1990 – The Blues Brothers Band Live in Montreux (WEA)
Other appearances: Blue Brothers Horns
 1995 – Jesse "Wild Bill" Austin: Baby's Back (Roesch Records)
 2000 – Matt "Guitar" Murphy: Lucky Charm (Roesch Records)
 2014 – Johnny Winter: Step Back (Megaforce)

Band members

Original lineup
While not all members appeared in the original film, the full band included:
 "Joliet" Jake E. Blues – lead vocals
 Elwood J. Blues – harmonica, vocals
 Steve "The Colonel" Cropper – lead and rhythm guitar (former Booker T & the M.G.'s)
 Matt "Guitar" Murphy – lead and rhythm guitar (Howlin' Wolf, other artists)
 Donald "Duck" Dunn – bass guitar (former Booker T & the M.G.'s)
 Paul "The Shiv" Shaffer – keyboards, arranger (Saturday Night Live Band, does not appear in the film)
 Murphy Dunne – keyboards, tambourine (appears in the film due to Paul Shaffer's commitment to perform with Gilda Radner in Gilda Live!, and toured with the band in the summer of 1980)
 Alan "Mr. Fabulous" Rubin – trumpet (Saturday Night Live Band)
 "Blue" Lou Marini – saxophone (Saturday Night Live Band)
 Tom "Triple Scale" Scott – saxophone (does not appear in the film, but played on the soundtrack)
 Tom "Bones" Malone – trombone, trumpet, saxophone (Saturday Night Live Band)
 Birch "Crimson Slide" Johnson – trombone (does not appear in the film)
 Willie "Too Big" Hall – drums, percussion (formerly of the Bar-Kays, Isaac Hayes' band, appears in the film)
 Steve "Getdwa" Jordan – drums, percussion (Saturday Night Live Band, appears only on the albums)

Other members
At times, other members have included:
 Jim Belushi (as "Brother" Zee Blues) – vocals
 John Goodman (as "Mighty Mack" McTeer) – vocals
 Buster Blues – harmonica, vocals (acted by J. Evan Bonifant in Blues Brothers 2000, actual harmonica recorded by John Popper)
 Joe Morton (as Cabel "Cab" Chamberlain) – vocals
 Cab Calloway – vocals (d. 1994)
 Larry "T" Thurston – vocals
 Eddie "Knock on Wood" Floyd – vocals
 Sam "Soul Man" Moore – vocals
 Bobby "Sweet Soul" Harden – vocals
 Tommy "Pipes" McDonnell – harmonica, vocals
 Rob "The Honeydripper" Paparozzi – harmonica, vocals
 Don Gregory Blues - vocals
 Andrea Mingardi - harmonica, vocals
 Leon "The Lion" Pendarvis – piano, vocals, arranger
 David "Spin" Spinozza – guitar
 Danny "G-Force" Gottlieb – drums
 Jimmy "Jimmy B" Biggins – saxophone
 "Dizzy" Daniel Moorehead – saxophone
 Anthony "Rusty" Cloud – clavinet, Wurlitzer, piano and organ
 Eric "The Red" Udel – bass
 John "Smokin" Tropea – guitar
 Jimmy "Mack" Hodge – guitar
 Lee "Funky Time" Finkelstein – drums
 Steve Potts – drums
 Anton Fig – drums
 Larry "Trombonius Maximus" Farrell – trombone
 Alto Reed – saxophone
 Steve "Catfish" Howard – trumpet
 Jonny "The Rock & Roll Doctor" Rosch – vocals, harmonica
 Francisco Simon – guitar

See also
 Recurring Saturday Night Live characters and sketches

Notes

References

External links
 Official DVD site
 Fan Site
 
 House of Blues Radio Hour (Hosted by Dan Aykroyd)
 Interview (MP3) with John Belushi biographer Tanner Colby and widow Judith Belushi Pisano on the public radio program The Sound of Young America regarding their book, Belushi. Includes clips from Belushi's work on The National Lampoon Radio Hour.
 The Blues Brothers DVD

 
Bands with fictional stage personas
American rhythm and blues musical groups
American blues rock musical groups
American soul musical groups
American musical duos
Musical groups from Chicago
Musical groups established in 1976
Musical groups disestablished in 1982
Musical groups reestablished in 1988
Atlantic Records artists
Booker T. & the M.G.'s
Dan Aykroyd